The 2014 World TeamTennis season was the 39th season of the top professional team tennis league in the United States. Pursuant to a sponsorship agreement with Mylan N.V., the official name of the league was Mylan World TeamTennis in 2014. The Washington Kastles defeated the Springfield Lasers in the WTT Final to win their fourth consecutive King Trophy.

Competition format
The 2014 World TeamTennis season included seven teams split into two conferences (Eastern and Western). The Eastern Conference had three teams and the Western Conference had four teams. Each team played a 14-match regular-season schedule with seven home and seven away matches. The top two teams in each conference qualified for the conference championship matches hosted by the first-place finishers. The conference champions met in the World TeamTennis Final hosted in 2014, by the Western Conference champion. An Eastern Conference champion that is a higher seed than a Western Conference champion is treated as the "home" team and has the right to determine order of play. The winner of the WTT Final is awarded the King Trophy.

Franchise movement and contraction
On November 21, 2013, WTT announced that entrepreneur Lorne Abony had purchased the Orange County Breakers and relocated the team to Cedar Park, Texas, renaming it the Austin Aces. Immediately after the transaction, the Aces acquired the rights to Austin's hometown hero Andy Roddick in a trade with the Springfield Lasers in exchange for financial consideration. The team remains in the Western Conference.

On January 6, 2014, WTT announced that San Diego businessman Russell Geyser had purchased the New York Sportimes and relocated the team, renaming it the San Diego Aviators. The team was moved by WTT from the Eastern Conference to the Western Conference.

On February 4, 2014, after 28 years in Sacramento, the Sacramento Capitals announced the team was moving to Las Vegas for the 2014 season and would be renamed the Las Vegas Neon. The Capitals cited dissatisfaction with the team's stadium, a temporary facility on the parking lot of a mall. Management made plans for the team to play the 2014 season in the Darling Tennis Center, a permanent 3,000-seat stadium about 11 miles west of the Las Vegas Strip in the Summerlin community within the Las Vegas city limits. On February 20, Neon principal owner Deepal Wannakuwatte was arrested on federal fraud charges. The assets of his Sacramento-based medical supply company, International Manufacturing Group Inc., were frozen by a federal judge. Wannakuwatte's family had owned the Capitals/Neon franchise since 2011. International Manufacturing Group Inc. was the parent company of Capital Sports Management LLC which was the legal owner of the Neon. With the assets frozen, Neon ownership was unable to meet its financial obligations to the WTT, and on March 5, the league contracted the franchise.

With the Sportimes moving from New York and becoming the San Diego Aviators and changing conferences, WTT had originally planned to move the Springfield Lasers from the Western Conference to the Eastern Conference and have four teams in each conference. After the contraction of the Las Vegas Neon, WTT decided to keep the Lasers in the Western Conference.

Drafts

Marquee player draft
The 2014 World TeamTennis Marquee Player Draft was conducted in New York City on February 11, 2014. The order in which teams selected was based on the results the teams achieved in 2013 with weaker teams selecting earlier and stronger teams selecting later. The order for relocated franchises was based on the results achieved in their previous city. Teams could protect up to two marquee players or doubles teams to which they held the rights from the previous season or acquired in a trade. These protected players could not be chosen by other teams unless the team protecting them failed to choose them in the draft. Rights to marquee players can be traded from one team to another before or during the draft, and the acquiring team may protect and then select those players. The selections made are shown in the tables below.

First round

Second round

Roster player draft
The 2014 World TeamTennis Roster Player Draft was conducted in Indian Wells, California on March 11, 2014. The order in which teams selected was based on the results the teams achieved in 2013 with weaker teams selecting earlier and stronger teams selecting later. The order for relocated franchises was based on the results achieved in their previous city. Teams could protect up to four players to which they held the rights from the previous season or acquired in a trade. These protected players could not be chosen by other teams unless the team protecting them failed to choose them in the draft. Rights to roster players can be traded from one team to another before or during the draft, and the acquiring team may protect and then select those players. In addition, the rights to make a selection in a particular position within the draft can be traded from one team to another. The selections made are shown in the tables below.

First round

Second round

Third round

Fourth round

Notes:

Event chronology

Regular season
 July 7: The San Diego Aviators and the Austin Aces opened their seasons against each other at the Valley View Casino Center in San Diego in the debut match for both teams after the relocations of their franchises. The Aviators ended a seven-match losing streak with which they ended the 2013 season as the New York Sportimes by beating the Aces, 23–11. The match opened with men's singles as Andy Roddick represented the Aces, and Somdev Devvarman took the court for the Aviators. Devvarman won the opening set, 5–2. The Aces struck back in the next set as Vera Zvonareva beat Daniela Hantuchová, 5–3, to cut the Aviators' lead to 8–7. But the Aviators took control of the match from there winning the next three sets. Raven Klaasen and Květa Peschke topped Roddick and Zvonareva, 5–2, in mixed doubles. Hantuchová and Peschke beat Eva Hrdinová and Zvonareva, 5–2, in women's doubles. Devvarman and Klaasen dominated Roddick and Treat Huey, 5–0, in men's doubles.
 July 8: The Austin Aces had a successful home debut at Cedar Park Center in Cedar Park, Texas just outside Austin against the Springfield Lasers in the first home match for the former Orange County Breakers after the franchise moved from Irvine, California. In a match nationally televised by the Tennis Channel, the Aces were led by Austin hometown hero Andy Roddick who beat the Michael Russell, 5–2, in the opening set to take the men's singles. The Lasers bounced back in men's doubles with Ross Hutchins and Michael Russell beating Treat Huey and Roddick, 5–2, to tie the match at 7–7. The Aces moved back in front as Marion Bartoli and Huey beat Olga Govortsova and Ross Hutchins in mixed doubles, 5–2. However, the Lasers tied the match again with a 5–2 set win in women's doubles by Līga Dekmeijere and Govortsova over Bartoli and Vera Zvonareva. In the final set, Zvonareva delivered a 5–3 win in women's singles over Govortsova to give the Aces a 19–17 victory.
 July 14: After opening the season with six consecutive victories, the Washington Kastles suffered their first defeat, losing at home to the San Diego Aviators, 22–18. Including the 2013 regular season and playoffs, the Kastles had won 18 in a row.
 July 15: After starting the season with six consecutive losses, the Boston Lobsters earned a 20–18 overtime victory over the Austin Aces that ended their eight-match losing streak going back to the 2013 regular season and playoffs. After Rik de Voest won the men's singles and Sharon Fichman and Megan Moulton-Levy won the women's doubles each by scores of 5–0, the Aces charged back from the 10–0 deficit to win the next three sets and force overtime. After losing the first three games of overtime and seeing their lead in the match reduced to 19–18, the Lobsters' mixed-doubles team of Moulton-Levy and de Voest won the fourth overtime game to avoid the super tiebreaker and secure the victory. This would be the only win of the season for the Lobsters.
 July 18: Despite losing their second straight match and third of the last four to fall to a record of 7 wins and 3 losses, the Washington Kastles clinched a playoff berth when the Philadelphia Freedoms defeated the Boston Lobsters, 25–14.
 July 19: With a record of 6 wins and 4 losses, the Philadelphia Freedoms clinched a playoff berth when the Washington Kastles defeated the Boston Lobsters, 23–9. The Lobsters were eliminated from the playoff race with the loss.
 July 20: The San Diego Aviators defeated the Springfield Lasers, 21–15, to improve their record to 8 wins and 4 losses. The Aviators got set wins from Květa Peschke and Daniela Hantuchová (5-3 in women's doubles), Mike Bryan and Peschke (5–4 in mixed doubles), Hantuchová (5–3 in women's singles) and Bob and Mike Bryan (5–0 in men's doubles). Later that evening, the Aviators clinched a playoff berth and home-court advantage for the Western Conference Championship Match when the Austin Aces defeated the Texas Wild, 22–16.
 July 22: The Washington Kastles won their third straight match and improved their record to 10 wins and 3 losses with a 23–15 victory over the Springfield Lasers and clinched home-court advantage for the Eastern Conference Championship Match. The Kastles got set wins from Sloane Stephens (5–2 in women's singles), Leander Paes and Bobby Reynolds (5–4 in men's doubles), Martina Hingis and Anastasia Rodionova (5—2 in women's doubles) and Hingis and Paes (5–2 in mixed doubles).
 July 23: The Springfield Lasers earned a victory on the last day of the regular season over the Boston Lobsters, 25–7, to clinch a playoff berth. The Lasers got set wins from Ross Hutchins and Michael Russell (5–2 in men's doubles), Olga Govortsova and Abigail Spears (5–0 in women's doubles), Hutchins and Spears (5–2 in mixed doubles), Govortsova (5–0 in women's singles) and Russell (5–4 in men's singles). The Lasers' win eliminated the Austin Aces and Texas Wild from the playoff race.
 July 23: The San Diego Aviators defeated the Austin Aces, 22–12, at Valley View Casino Center to give them the best regular-season record in WTT in 2014. The Aviators and Washington Kastles both finished the season with 10 wins and 4 loss, but the Aviators won the only regular-season meeting between the teams, giving them a tiebreaker edge. The Aviators won four of the five sets in the match against the Aces and were led by Somdev Devvarman (5–0 in men's singles), Bob Bryan and Květa Peschke (5–2 in mixed doubles), Daniela Hantuchová (5–3 in women's singles) and Bob and Mike Bryan (5–2 in men's doubles).

Playoffs
 July 24: The three-time defending WTT Champion Washington Kastles opened the postseason defense of their title by hosting the Philadelphia Freedoms. The Kastles got set wins from Bobby Reynolds (5–3 in men's singles), Martina Hingis and Leander Paes (5–2 in mixed doubles) and Hingis and Anastasia Rodionova (5–1 in women's doubles). After Frank Dancevic and Marcelo Melo won the fifth set for the Freedoms, Paes and Bobby Reynolds won the first game of overtime to give the Kastles a 21–16 victory and their fourth consecutive Eastern Conference Championship.
 July 24: In the first-ever playoff match for the San Diego Aviators since the franchise relocated from New York, the Aviators hosted the defending Western Conference Champion Springfield Lasers. The Lasers got set wins from Michael Russell (5–4 in men's singles), Olga Govortsova (5–0 in women's singles) and Russell and Ross Hutchins (5–3 in men's doubles) on their way to a 22–17 victory and their second consecutive Western Conference Championship.
 July 27: The Washington Kastles won their fourth consecutive King Trophy with a 25–13 victory in the WTT Final against the Springfield Lasers in Springfield, Missouri in a match nationally televised on ESPN2 (joined in progress during the first set). The Kastles won all five sets of the match: Bobby Reynolds (5–4 in men's singles), Martina Hingis (5–2 in women's singles), Reynolds and Leander Paes (5–2 in men's doubles), Hingis and Anastasia Rodionova (5–1 in women's doubles) and Paes and Hingis (5–4 in mixed doubles). Hingis was named Championship Most Valuable Player.

Standings

 Austin won 2 of the 3 matches it played against Texas placing it third in the Western Conference.
 San Diego won the only match it played against Washington and thus finished with the league's best record.

Results table

Playoff bracket

* indicates match went to overtime.

Playoff match summaries

Eastern Conference Championship Match
July 24 at Kastles Stadium at Charles E. Smith Center, Washington, D.C.: Washington Kastles 21, Philadelphia Freedoms 16, overtime
 Men's singles: Bobby Reynolds (Kastles) def. Frank Dancevic (Freedoms), 5–3
 Women's singles: Taylor Townsend (Freedoms) def. Martina Hingis (Kastles), 5–2
 Mixed doubles: Martina Hingis and Leander Paes (Kastles) def. Liezel Huber and Marcelo Melo (Freedoms), 5–2
 Women's doubles: Martina Hingis and Anastasia Rodionova (Kastles) def. Liezel Huber and Taylor Townsend (Freedoms), 5–1
 Men's doubles: Frank Dancevic and Marcelo Melo (Freedoms) def. Leander Paes and Bobby Reynolds (Kastles), 5–3
 Overtime – Men's doubles: Leander Paes and Bobby Reynolds (Kastles) def. Frank Dancevic and Marcelo Melo (Freedoms), 1–0

Western Conference Championship Match
July 24 at Valley View Casino Center, San Diego, California: Springfield Lasers 22, San Diego Aviators 17
 Men's singles: Michael Russell (Lasers) def. Somdev Devvarman (Aviators), 5–4
 Women's doubles: Květa Peschke and Daniela Hantuchová (Aviators) def. Olga Govortsova and Līga Dekmeijere (Lasers), 5–4
 Mixed doubles: Bob Bryan and Květa Peschke (Aviators) def. Ross Hutchins and Olga Govortsova (Lasers), 5–3
 Women's singles: Olga Govortsova (Lasers) def. Daniela Hantuchová (Aviators), 5–0
 Men's doubles: Michael Russell and Ross Hutchins (Lasers) def. Bob Bryan and Mike Bryan (Aviators), 5–3

WTT Final Match
July 27 at Mediacom Stadium at Cooper Tennis Complex, Springfield, Missouri: Washington Kastles 25, Springfield Lasers 13
 Men's singles: Bobby Reynolds (Kastles) def. Michael Russell (Lasers), 5–4
 Women's singles: Martina Hingis (Kastles) def. Olga Govortsova (Lasers), 5–2
 Men's doubles: Bobby Reynolds and Leander Paes (Kastles) def. Ross Hutchins and Michael Russell (Lasers), 5–2
 Women's doubles: Martina Hingis and Anastasia Rodionova (Kastles) def. Olga Govortsova and Līga Dekmeijere (Lasers), 5–1
 Mixed doubles: Leander Paes and Martina Hingis (Kastles) def. Ross Hutchins and Olga Govortsova (Lasers), 5–4

Note:

Individual statistical leaders
The tables below show the WTT players who had the highest regular-season winning percentages in each of the league's five events. Only players who played in at least 40% of the total number of games played by their team in a particular event are eligible to be listed among the official WTT league leaders for that event.

Men's singles

Women's singles

Men's doubles

Women's doubles

Mixed doubles

Individual honors
Reference: 

Note:

Team statistics
The tables below show the regular-season winning percentages of each team in each of the league's five events.

Men's singles

Women's singles

Men's doubles

Women's doubles

Mixed doubles

Television
The Tennis Channel broadcast four matches nationally. However, only one was shown live; the other three were shown on tape delay. The matches shown by the Tennis Channel were
 July 8 at 7:30 pm CDT: Springfield Lasers at Austin Aces (broadcast on tape delay at 12:00 midnight EDT on July 9)
 July 15 at 7:00 pm EDT: San Diego Aviators at Philadelphia Freedoms (broadcast on tape delay at 10:00 pm EDT)
 July 16 at 7:00 pm EDT: Texas Wild at Washington Kastles (broadcast on tape delay at 10:00 pm EDT)
 July 22 at 7:00 pm PDT: Texas Wild at San Diego Aviators (broadcast live)

The WTT Final between the Washington Kastles and the Springfield Lasers on July 27 at 4:00 pm CDT was broadcast live by ESPN2, but was scheduled to be joined in progress at 6:00 pm EDT, approximately one hour after the match's scheduled starting time. However, ESPN2's coverage of the 2014 Atlanta Open ended earlier than expected, and the network went to coverage of the WTT Final earlier than originally planned, joining the match during the first set.

In addition to the five national telecasts described above, several matches were shown by regional sports networks, and many of these were made available to affiliated channels in other markets.

See also

References

External links
 World TeamTennis official website
 2014 World TeamTennis Media Guide

World Team season
World TeamTennis season
World TeamTennis seasons